North Carolina's 54th House district is one of 120 districts in the North Carolina House of Representatives. It has been represented by Democrat Robert Reives since 2014.

Geography
Since 2023, the district has included all of Chatham County, as well as part of Randolph County. The district overlaps with the 20th and 25th Senate districts.

District officeholders since 1993

Election results

2022

2020

2018

2016

2014

2012

2010

2008

2006

2004

2002

2000

References

North Carolina House districts
Chatham County, North Carolina
Randolph County, North Carolina